Jean Emily Hay (17 June 1903–14 February 1984) was a New Zealand teacher, broadcaster and early childhood educator. She was born in Collie, Western Australia, Australia on 17 June 1903. She taught at the Christchurch Normal School.

References

1903 births
1984 deaths
New Zealand educators
New Zealand broadcasters
People educated at Otago Girls' High School
People educated at Timaru Girls' High School
Australian emigrants to New Zealand